Dehang (also known as Dahūn, Deh-e Hong, Deh Hang, Deh Hong, and Dehun) is a village in Godeh Rural District, in the Central District of Bastak County, Hormozgan Province, Iran. At the 2006 census, its population was 1,636, in 344 families.

References 

Populated places in Bastak County